The year 2007 is the fourth year in the history of the Konfrontacja Sztuk Walki, a mixed martial arts promotion based in Poland. In 2007 Konfrontacja Sztuk Walki held 3 events beginning with, KSW VII: Konfrontacja.

List of events

KSW VII: Konfrontacja

KSW VII: Konfrontacja was a mixed martial arts event  held on June 2, 2007 at the Hala Torwar in Warsaw, Poland.

Results

KSW Elimination 1

KSW Elimination was a mixed martial arts event held on September 15, 2007 at the Hala Orbita in Wroclaw, Poland .

Results

KSW VIII: Konfrontacja

KSW VIII: Konfrontacja was a mixed martial arts event held on November 10, 2007 at the Hala Torwar in Warsaw, Poland.

Results

References

Konfrontacja Sztuk Walki events
2007 in mixed martial arts